The Teleorman is a left tributary of the river Vedea in Romania. It discharges into the Vedea near Smârdioasa. The following towns and villages are situated along the river Teleorman, from source to mouth: Gura Văii, Albota, Podu Broșteni, Broșteni, Costești, Șerboeni, Ionești, Vlăduța, Podeni, Cornățel, Recea, Izvoru, Palanga, Popești, Tătărăștii de Sus, Tătărăștii de Jos, Slăvești, Trivalea-Moșteni, Olteni, Orbeasca, Lăceni, Măgura, Vitănești, Purani, Teleormanu, Mârzănești, Cernetu and Ștorobăneasa.

Tributaries

The following rivers are tributaries of the Teleorman (from source to mouth):

Left: Mareș, Albota, Băidana, Negraș, Pârâul Dobrei, Clănița, Vâjiștea
Right: Valea Copacilor, Bucov, Teleormănel

References

Rivers of Romania
Rivers of Argeș County
Rivers of Teleorman County